The Europe Male was an event on the 2008 Vintage Yachting Games program at the IJsselmeer, Netherlands. Six out of the seven scheduled race were completed. 9 sailors, on 9 boats, from 5 nations entered.

Venue overview

Race area and Course
Approximately 2 nautical miles of the coast of Medemblik two course areas (orange and yellow) were used for the 2008 edition of the Vintage Yachting Games.

For the 2008 edition of the Vintage Yachting Games four different courses were available. The Europe Male could only use course 1.

Wind conditions 
During the 2008 Vintage Yachting Games the sailors experienced the following weather conditions:

Races

Summary 
In the Europe Male at race area Orange only six races could be completed.

By the male participants, Thomas Ribeaud, France, got a major lead of over 16 points over his opponent Marc Paris Gilbert from Spain. Arne Berg from Germany took the bronze.

Results 

 dnc = did not compete
 dns = did not start
 dnf = did not finish
 dsq = disqualified
 ocs = on course side
 ret = retired after finish
 Crossed out results did not count for the total result.

Daily standings

Victors

References 

 

Europe Male